The Miami Marlins farm system consists of six Minor League Baseball affiliates across the United States and in the Dominican Republic. Three teams are owned by the major league club, while the Pensacola Blue Wahoos, Beloit Sky Carp, and Jupiter Hammerheads are independently owned.

The Marlins have been affiliated with the Single-A Jupiter Hammerheads of the Florida State League since 2002, making it the longest-running active affiliation in the organization among teams not owned by the Marlins. It is also the longest affiliation in the team's history. 

2021–present
The current structure of Minor League Baseball is the result of an overall contraction of the system beginning with the 2021 season. Class A was reduced to two levels: High-A and Low-A. Class A Short Season teams and domestic Rookie League teams that operated away from spring training facilities were eliminated. Low-A was reclassified as Single-A in 2022.

1990–2020
Minor League Baseball operated with six classes from 1990 to 2020. The Class A level was subdivided for a second time with the creation of Class A-Advanced. The Rookie level consisted of domestic and foreign circuits.

References

External links 
 Major League Baseball Prospect News: Miami Marlins
 Baseball-Reference: Miami Marlins League Affiliations

Miami Marlins lists
Miami Marlins minor league affiliates